Ronald Moore (birth unknown – death unknown) was a rugby union and professional rugby league footballer who played in the 1930s.

Playing career

County Cup Final appearances
Ron Moore didn't play in Wakefield Trinity's 5-5 draw with Leeds in the 1934 Yorkshire County Cup Final during the 1934–35 season at Crown Flatt, Dewsbury on Saturday 27 October 1934, but played right-, i.e. number 3, in the 2-2 draw with Leeds in the 1934 Yorkshire County Cup Final replay during the 1934–35 season at Fartown Ground, Huddersfield on Wednesday 31 October 1934, and played , i.e. number 2, in the 0-13 defeat by Leeds in the 1934 Yorkshire County Cup Final second replay during the 1934–35 season at Parkside, Hunslet on Wednesday 7 November 1934.

Club career
Ron Moore made his début for Wakefield Trinity during October 1933, he appears to have scored no drop-goals (or field-goals as they are currently known in Australasia), but prior to the 1974–75 season all goals, whether; conversions, penalties, or drop-goals, scored 2-points, consequently prior to this date drop-goals were often not explicitly documented, therefore '0' drop-goals may indicate drop-goals not recorded, rather than no drop-goals scored. In addition, prior to the 1949–50 season, the archaic field-goal was also still a valid means of scoring points.

References

External links
Search for "Moore" at rugbyleagueproject.org

Bramley RLFC players
English rugby league players
English rugby union players
People from Bream, Gloucestershire
Place of birth missing
Place of death missing
Rugby league centres
Wakefield Trinity players
Year of birth missing
Year of death missing